Ćiril Ban (5 July 1910 – 2 July 1987) was a Croatian rower. He competed in two events at the 1936 Summer Olympics.

References

External links
 

1910 births
1987 deaths
Croatian male rowers
Olympic rowers of Yugoslavia
Rowers at the 1936 Summer Olympics
Sportspeople from Šibenik